1955 European Rowing Championships may refer to:

 1955 European Rowing Championships (women)
 1955 European Rowing Championships (men)

European Rowing Championships